Christian Andrés Vaquero Abad (born 8 January 1986) is a Uruguayan professional footballer who plays as a forward for C.A. Bella Vista.

References

External links 
 BDFA Profile
 
 Christian Vaquero at Footballdatabase

1986 births
Living people
Uruguayan footballers
Uruguayan expatriate footballers
C.A. Cerro players
Boston River players
Alianza F.C. footballers
Santa Tecla F.C. footballers
C.D. Dragón footballers
Sriwijaya F.C. players
Guabirá players
Huracán F.C. players
Boyacá Chicó F.C. footballers
C.A. Progreso players
Oriental players
C.A. Bella Vista players 
Uruguayan Primera División players
Uruguayan Segunda División players
Categoría Primera A players
Association football forwards
Uruguayan expatriate sportspeople in El Salvador
Uruguayan expatriate sportspeople in Indonesia
Uruguayan expatriate sportspeople in Bolivia
Uruguayan expatriate sportspeople in Colombia
Uruguayan expatriate sportspeople in Guatemala
Expatriate footballers in El Salvador
Expatriate footballers in Indonesia
Expatriate footballers in Bolivia
Expatriate footballers in Colombia
Expatriate footballers in Guatemala